John Compton Butterworth (17 August 1905 – 18 March 1941) was an English first-class cricketer who played for Middlesex in 1925 and Oxford University in 1926. He was born in Samarang, Java (then part of the Dutch East Indies), and was educated at Harrow School and Magdalen College, Oxford. He joined the Royal Air Force and in August 1936 played for the RAF in their annual match against the Royal Navy at Lord's. However, during World War II he was commissioned in the Royal Artillery and was killed at Shooter's Hill, London when a bomb exploded near his anti-aircraft battery.

References

1905 births
1941 deaths
English cricketers
Middlesex cricketers
Oxford University cricketers
People educated at Harrow School
Alumni of Magdalen College, Oxford
Royal Artillery officers
British Army personnel killed in World War II
20th-century Royal Air Force personnel
Deaths by airstrike during World War II
British expatriates in the Dutch East Indies